Lubu may refer to :

 the Lubu people of Indonesia or
 the Lubu language spoken by these people.